The tables list the Malayalam films released in theatres in the year 2012. Premiere shows and film festival screenings are not considered as releases for this list.

Released films

The following is the list of Malayalam films released in the year 2012.

Malayalam films

References

2012
 2012
Malayalam
Malayalam